The 2015 Leeds City Council election took place on Thursday 7 May 2015 to elect members of Leeds City Council in England. It was held on the same day as the 2015 general election and other local elections across the UK.

As per the election cycle, one third of the council's seats were up for election. The councillors subsequently elected replaced those elected when their individual seats were previously contested in 2011.

No political party gained or lost any seats and the Labour Party retained all 22 of their contested council seats and their majority control of the council since 2011.

Election summary

This result had the following consequences for the total number of seats on the council after the elections:

Councillors who did not stand for re-election

Ward results
The electoral division results listed below are based on the changes from the 2011 elections, not taking into account any mid-term by-elections or party defections.

Notes

References

2015 English local elections
May 2015 events in the United Kingdom
2015
2010s in Leeds